Chiaserna is a small fraction of the City of Cantiano in province of Pesaro and Urbino in the Region Marche.

References

External links 
 Official WebSite
 Cantiano (municipality)

Municipalities of the Province of Pesaro and Urbino